Micromyrtus navicularis is a plant species of the family Myrtaceae endemic to Western Australia.

It is found on hill slopes in the Goldfields-Esperance region of Western Australia in the Fitzgerald River National Park and surrounding areas where it grows in gravelly sandy soils over granite or laterite.

References

navicularis
Endemic flora of Western Australia
Myrtales of Australia
Rosids of Western Australia
Vulnerable flora of Australia
Plants described in 2006
Taxa named by Barbara Lynette Rye